Atriplex pacifica is a species of saltbush known by the common names Davidson's saltbush, South Coast saltbush, and Pacific orach.

It is native to the coastline of Southern California, including the Channel Islands, and Baja California, where it grows in saline habitat on the immediate coastline, such as beach bluffs. It is an uncommon plant, chiefly because much of its native habitat has been drastically altered.

This is a mat-forming annual herb producing scaly, reddish green, prostrate stems 10 to 30 centimeters long. The leaves are less than 2 centimeters long, usually oval in shape, with gray-green scaly undersides. Male flowers are borne in terminal spike inflorescences that emerge from the distal end of the branches, while female flower clusters appear proximally on the branches.

External links
 Calflora Database: Atriplex pacifica (Pacific saltbrush,  South coast saltbush)
Jepson Manual eFlora (TJM2) treatment of Atriplex pacifica
USDA Plants Profile for Atriplex pacifica (Davidson's saltbush)
Flora of North America
UC Photos gallery: Atriplex pacifica

pacifica
Halophytes
Flora of California
Flora of Baja California
Natural history of the California chaparral and woodlands
Natural history of the Channel Islands of California
Plants described in 1904
Flora without expected TNC conservation status